The 1997 Senior British Open was a professional golf tournament for players aged 50 and above and the 11th British Senior Open Championship, held from 24 to 27 July at Royal Portrush Golf Club in Portrush, County Antrim, Northern Ireland, United Kingdom.

In 2018, the tournament was, as all Senior British Open Championships played 1987–2002, retroactively recognized as a senior major golf championship and a PGA Tour Champions (at the time named the Senior PGA Tour) event.

62-year-old Gary Player won in a playoff over John Bland to win his third Senior British Open title and ninth senior major championship victory.

Venue
The event was the third Senior Open Championship in a row held at Royal Portrush Golf Club.

Field
121 professionals, no amateurs, entered the competition. One of them withdraw and one was disqualified. 71 players, all of them professionals and no amateurs, made the 36-hole cut.

Past champions in the field
Seven past Senior British Open champions participated. Six of them made the 36-hole cut; 1988 and 1990 champion Gary Player (won), 1991 champion Bobby Verwey (tied 5th), 1994 champion Tom Wargo (tied 6th), 1992 champion John Fourie (tied 15th), 1987 champion  Neil Coles (tied 24th) and 1989 and 1993 champion Bob Charles (tied 34th). 1995 and 1996 champion Brian Barnes withdraw after a first round 2-under-par 70.

Past winners and runners-up at The Open Championship in the field 
The field included two former winners of The Open Championship. Both of them made the cut, 1959, 1968 and 1974 Open champion Gary Player (won) and 1963 Open champion Bob Charles (tied 34th).

The field also included three former runners-up at The Open Championship. Neil Coles (24th), Brian Huggett (tied 26th) and Christy O'Connor Snr (missed the cut).

Final round and playoff summaries

Final round
Sunday, 27 July 1997

Gary Player, South Africa and his fellow countryman John Bland tied the lead after the fourth round, to meet in a sudden death playoff, to decide the winner. Player scored a bogey-free 68 in the final round, to catch up Bland, who led by two strokes before the final round.

Noel Ratcliffe scored a bogey 5 on the 18th hole of the final round to came one shot short of joining the playoff.

Playoff
Sunday, 27 July 1997

The sudden-death playoff went on, to be played until one of the players had a lower score on the hole than the other. Gary Player beat John Bland with a birdie at the second extra hole, the par 5 17th hole, by holing a 15-foot putt.

References

External links 
 Results on European Tour website

Senior major golf championships
Golf tournaments in Northern Ireland
Senior British Open
Senior British Open
Senior British Open